The Uganda Senior Command and Staff College (USCSC)  is a training facility for senior commanders in the Uganda People's Defense Force (UPDF), including the army, air force, and special forces.

Location
This location is adjacent to Jinja Airport, the civilian and military airport that serves the city of Jinja. The coordinates of Kimaka are 0°27'09.0"N, 33°11'55.0"E (Latitude:0.452490; Longitude:33.198600).

History
The college was established in 2003. The first commandant was Major General Benon Biraaro. The first group of students was admitted in 2004 to attend the senior command course that lasted one year. The first officers to graduate from the college included some of the most senior leaders of the UPDF. The course has been given every year since and has been attended by the majority of the senior commanders in the UPDF. As of June 2020, the commandant of USCSC was Lieutenant General Andrew Gutti.

Courses
The most popular and widely attended course is the senior command course, conducted annually. The course is attended by senior officers from the UPDF and by senior military officers from other African countries including Kenya, Tanzania, South Sudan and Rwanda. Other courses, including strategic courses in peacekeeping, have been in the planning stages.

In 2018, the college graduated the first class of military officers who had undergone a year's education, graduating with a Master of Arts degree in Defence and Security.

Alumni
The graduates of the USCSC include, but are not limited to, the following:
 Elly Tumwine - Former Commander of the UPDF 
 Salim Saleh - Former Commander of the UPDF
 David Sejusa - Former Director of National Intelligence, Uganda
 Elly Kayanja - Deputy Director of National Intelligence, Uganda
 Nobel Mayombo - Former Permanent Secretary, Uganda Ministry of Defense
 Julius Oketta - Member of Parliament, Director of National Emergency Coordination and Operations. Member of Advisory Group of  United Nations Central Emergency Response Fund 
 Peter Kerim - Deputy Director of the External Security Organization
 Shaban Bantariza - Deputy Executive Director, Uganda Media Centre
 Sabiiti Muzeyi - Deputy Inspector General of Police, former Commander of the UPDF Military Police.

Photos
 USCSC Class of 2009

See also
 National Resistance Army
 Uganda Military Academy
 List of military schools in Uganda
 List of Universities in Uganda
 Ivan Koreta

References

External links
 About USCSC
 Personal Experience of a Graduate of USCSC
 USCSC Inaugurates Board of Directors

 

Educational institutions established in 2003
Uganda People's Defence Force
Military schools in Uganda
Military schools
Staff colleges
Military of Uganda
Jinja District
Jinja, Uganda
Busoga
2003 establishments in Uganda